Maccabi Tel Aviv is a handball club based in Tel Aviv, Israel. They compete in the Liga Leumit, and host their home games in Tichonet, Tel Aviv. The club is under full ownership of Maccabi Tel Aviv Foundation; its chairman is Eyal Frolinger.

History

Early years 
The handball team of Maccabi Tel Aviv was founded in the 1930s when handball was first played in Mandatory Palestine. The club was initially three separate clubs; Maccabi North Tel Aviv, who won three national cups in a row between 1963 and 1965, Maccabi Tel Aviv and Brit Maccabim Atid. Over time the three clubs gradually amalgamated under the name of Maccabi Tel Aviv.

Over the years, players such as Avraham Shneior, Moshe Resch, Yoav Drucker, Mickey Tenenbaum and Avi Resch played in the team. All these players were also part of the Israeli national team and represented the country in a lot of international tournaments and cups.

Except the three State Cups the club won during the 60's, Maccabi Tel Aviv wasn't a successful team in the Israeli handball and considered as a mid-table team for a lot of years. In 1998, the team reached the State Cup final but lost it to Hapoel Rishon Lezion.

2000s 
After several years as a mid-table team, in 1999 the team started to regrow. The Maccabi Tel Aviv foundation began to invest more money in the handball department, the youth system in the club recovered and there were efforts to bring fans to home games.

Until 2009, these attempts were not successful. But this year Maccabi reached the State Cup semi-final, where they lost to the local rivals ASA Tel Aviv. The team finished the season in the fourth place of the league. One year later, the club established its first youth team. In the 2010–11 season, the team finished fifth in the league and was eliminated in the Last 16 round of the State Cup.

In 2011–12, Maccabi finished the regular season in the third place and lost to Maccabi Rishon Lezion in the playoffs semi-finals. They were beaten by Hapoel Rishon Lezion in the State Cup final. In the same season they reached the semi-finals of the EHF Challenge Cup, but then lost to the Greek Diomidis Argous. 

The financial investment in the team grew and they won their first championship in the 2013–14 season, after a sweep in the finals series against Hapoel Rishon Lezion. They did it again two years later, in the 2015–16 season, with Nedeljko Matić as head coach and with Milan Kosanović and Novak Bošković as the foreign players.

Maccabi started the 2016–17 season by terminating Nedeljko Matić contract, even though he won a championship with the team. They appointed Dragan Đukić as head coach and signed Israeli internationals Chen Pomeranz and Alex Sychenko. Maccabi lost to ABC/UMinho (27–34), but defeated Achilles Bocholt (33–30) in the qualification tournament of the 2016–17 EHF Champions League. As a result, they continued in the third qualifying round of the 2016–17 EHF Cup, where they defeated St. Petersburg HC and qualified, for the first time of their history, to the group stage. They hosted their home games in the group stage at the Drive in Arena.

Current squad

Honours
 Israeli league
Winners: 2014, 2016.
State Cup
Winners: 1963, 1964, 1965, 2017.

European record

See also
Maccabi Tel Aviv
Maccabi Tel Aviv F.C.
Maccabi Tel Aviv B.C.

Maccabi Tel Aviv
Israeli handball clubs